The Belgian Expeditionary Corps of Armoured Cars in Russia was a Belgian military unit sent to Russia during World War I. It fought alongside the Imperial Russian army on the Eastern Front. Between 1915 and 1918, 444 Belgian soldiers served with the unit of whom 16 were killed in action.

History

In August 1914, the German Empire invaded neutral Belgium. The campaign was initially very successful, pushing the Belgian, French and British forces westwards. By the end of 1914, however, the Western Front had stabilised into static trench warfare. Following the Battle of the Yser in October, the Belgian army remained entrenched along the Yser Front and was left with a number of armoured cars which could not be used. In early 1915, the Russian Tsar Nicholas II formally requested military support from King Albert I and a self-contained unit was formed for service in Russia. As Belgium was officially an independent neutral power rather than an ally of the Russian Empire Belgian soldiers in this unit were officially considered as volunteers in the Imperial Russian Army itself.

The first contingent of the Belgian Expeditionary Corps (333 volunteers equipped with Mors and Peugeot armoured cars) arrived in Archangel in October 1915. The unit fought with distinction in Galicia and was mentioned in the Order of the Day five times.

After the Bolshevik Revolution in 1917, the Belgian force remained in Russia until the Treaty of Brest-Litovsk withdrew Russia from the war. After the ceasefire, the unit found itself in hostile territory. As the route north to Murmansk was blocked, the soldiers destroyed their armoured cars to prevent their capture by Bolshevik forces. The unit finally reached the United States through China and the Trans-Siberian railway in June 1918.

A similar, slightly larger British unit, the RNAS Armoured Car Expeditionary Force (ACEF), also served in Russia during the same period.

Notable personnel
The unit was never particularly numerous, but included some notable personnel:
 Henri Herd, known as "Constant le Marin", who was a prominent boxer and 4-time World Champion
Henry George, track cyclist who won a gold medal at the 1920 Summer Olympics
Julien Lahaut, politician and chief of the Communist Party of Belgium who was assassinated in 1950.
Marcel Thiry, Walloon poet, who served in the corps with his brother Oscar.
Théo Halleux, construction contractor who built the first high multi-storey buildings in Liège.

Commemoration
From 1931, soldiers who had served with the unit were awarded the 1914–1918 Commemorative War Medal with a bar (reading "1916—R—1917" or "1916—R—1918") denoting service in Russia. The last veteran of the unit died in 1992.

In 2014–15, the Royal Museum of the Armed Forces and Military History in Brussels raised 40,000 euros towards building a replica Mors-Minerva armoured car. The vehicle went on display in the markings of the Expeditionary Corps in 2015.

In fiction and popular culture
The 2015 Belgian animated drama-action film Cafard ("Cockroach" in French) tells the story of a boxer, Jean Mordant (based on the real-life Henri Herd, known as Constant le Marin), who joins the Expeditionary Corps in order to avenge the rape of his daughter by German soldiers in Occupied Belgium.

The band 1914 wrote a song called Corps d’autos-canons-mitrailleuses (A.C.M)  in the album 'Where Fear and Weapons Meat' about their experience during their time on the Eastern Front, and their subsequent journey to get home after two years and the Bolshevik Revolution.

See also

 Russian Expeditionary Force in France
 Belgian Legion
 Belgian Volunteer Corps for Korea

References

Further reading

External links
 King Albert's Heroes: How 400 young Belgians fought in Russia and conquered the United States, lecture by August Thiry (Thomas More College, Mechelen) to the Institute of European Studies, UC Berkeley. Uploaded to YouTube 1 Oct 2018.

Military history of Belgium during World War I
Military units and formations established in 1915
Military units and formations disestablished in 1918
Military units and formations of Russia in World War I
Military units and formations of Belgium
Expeditionary units and formations
Military units and formations of Belgium in World War I
Belgium–Russia relations